Island In The Sun is the third studio album by Malibu, California rapper Shwayze and Cisco Adler. The album was first announced on May 20, 2011 with an initial release date slated for August 16, 2011. The album was later delayed before ultimately being released on September 13, 2011.

Track listing

References

2011 albums
Shwayze albums